Yonkers Avenue is an east–west street in the city of Yonkers in Westchester County, New York, in the United States. It is one of four major east–west through routes in the city. The western terminus of the street is at Nepperhan Avenue, which connects to U.S. Route 9 (US 9) and New York State Route 9A (NY 9A). Its eastern terminus is at Bronx River Road near the Bronx River Parkway. The entirety of Yonkers Avenue is maintained by the New York State Department of Transportation as New York State Route 983C from Nepperhan Avenue to the Saw Mill River Parkway and New York State Route 984E from the Saw Mill Parkway to Bronx River Road. Both are unsigned reference route designations.

A continuation of Yonkers Avenue east into Mount Vernon is signed as "To Mount Vernon Avenue" for the street it connects to on the opposite bank of the Bronx River.

Major intersections

See also

List of county routes in Westchester County, New York
List of reference routes in New York

References

Streets in Yonkers, New York
Transportation in Yonkers, New York